The 2019 Coca-Cola 600, the 60th running of the event, was a Monster Energy NASCAR Cup Series race held on May 26, 2019, at Charlotte Motor Speedway in Concord, North Carolina. Contested over 400 laps on the 1.5 mile (2.42 km) asphalt speedway, it was the 13th race of the 2019 Monster Energy NASCAR Cup Series season. Martin Truex Jr. won his fourth race of the season, second Coca-Cola 600, and 22nd career victory overall.

Report

Background

The race was held at Charlotte Motor Speedway, which is located in Concord, North Carolina. The speedway complex includes a  quad-oval track that will be utilized for the race, as well as a dragstrip and a dirt track. The speedway was built in 1959 by Bruton Smith and is considered the home track for NASCAR with many race teams based in the Charlotte metropolitan area. The track is owned and operated by Speedway Motorsports Inc. (SMI) with Marcus G. Smith serving as track president.

For the race, every car on track would sport a fallen military member tribute on their cars.

Entry list
 (i) denotes driver who are ineligible for series driver points.
 (R) denotes rookie driver.

First practice

Qualifying

Qualifying results

Practice (post-qualifying)

Second practice

Final practice

Race

Stage results

Stage 1
Laps: 100

Stage 2
Laps: 100

Stage 3
Laps: 100

Final stage results

Stage 4
Laps: 100

Race statistics
 Lead changes: 30 among 11 different drivers
 Cautions/Laps: 16 for 80
 Red flags: 1 for 1 minute and 56 seconds
 Time of race: 4 hours, 50 minutes and 9 seconds
 Average speed:

Media

Television
Fox Sports televised the race in the United States for the 19th consecutive year. Mike Joy was the lap-by-lap announcer, while three-time Coca-Cola 600 winner, Jeff Gordon and five-time race winner Darrell Waltrip were the color commentators. Jamie Little, Regan Smith, Vince Welch and Matt Yocum reported from pit lane during the race.

Radio
Radio coverage of the race was broadcast by the Performance Racing Network (PRN), and was simulcasted on Sirius XM NASCAR Radio. Doug Rice and Mark Garrow called the race in the booth when the field raced through the quad-oval. Rob Albright reported the race from a billboard in turn 2 when the field was racing through turns 1 and 2 and halfway down the backstretch. Pat Patterson called the race from a billboard outside of turn 3 when the field raced through the other half of the backstretch and through turns 3 and 4. Brad Gillie, Brett McMillan, Wendy Venturini and Steve Richards were the pit reporters during the broadcast.

Standings after the race

Drivers' Championship standings

Manufacturers' Championship standings

Note: Only the first 16 positions are included for the driver standings.
. – Driver has clinched a position in the Monster Energy NASCAR Cup Series playoffs.

References

Coca-Cola 600
Coca-Cola 600
Coca-Cola 600
NASCAR races at Charlotte Motor Speedway